Duong Saree (born 1957) is a Cambodian artist and illustrator.

She studied for a degree in plastic arts at the Royal University of Fine Arts in Phnom Penh, Cambodia, in 1970 and pursued a career in art. In 2003, she produced an exhibition of his works at Providence College, Rhode Island, USA.
She has also illustrated books and covers in Cambodia.

Exhibitions
1990: "Redd Barna in Cambodia" (cover publication of the book).
2000: "The Legacy of absence: a Cambodian story" Reyum, Phnom Penh, Cambodia.
2002: "Visions of the Future", Reyum, Phnom Penh, Cambodia.
2003: "The Spirit of Cambodia... a tribute", Providence College, Rhode Island, USA.

Awards
2010: You Khin Memorial Women's Art Prize

References

External links
Saklapel.org

1957 births
Cambodian artists
Living people
20th-century Cambodian artists
21st-century Cambodian artists